John Sanders may refer to:

John Sanders (architect) (1768–1826), British architect
John Sanders (sportscaster), American sports broadcaster
John C. C. Sanders (1840–1864), general in the Confederate States Army
John Oswald Sanders (1902–1992), New Zealand lawyer, author and general director of Overseas Missionary Fellowship
John Sanders (musician) (1933–2003), British organist, conductor, choir trainer and composer
John E. Sanders (born 1956), American evangelical Christian theologian
John Sanders (baseball) (1945-2022), American baseball player and coach
John Sanders (painter) (1750–1825), English painter
John "Deac" Sanders (born 1950), American football player
John Holloway Sanders (1825–1884), architect based in England
John Sanders, owner and perhaps painter of the Sanders portrait of William Shakespeare (1603)

See also
Jon Sanders (disambiguation)
Johnny Sanders (disambiguation)
John Saunders (disambiguation)